Chang Prefecture may refer to:

Cháng Prefecture (常州), a prefecture between the 6th and 13th centuries in modern Jiangsu, China
Chāng Prefecture (昌州), a prefecture between the 8th and 13th centuries in modern Chongqing, China
Zhang Prefecture (漳州), a prefecture in modern Fujian, China, romanized as Chang Prefecture in the Wade–Giles system

See also
Changzhou (disambiguation)
Chang (disambiguation)